Francisco Zamora Salinas (1939–2002), football player from El Salvador.

Francisco Zamora may also refer to:

 Francisco Zamora (OFM) de Cuenca, on List of Ministers General of the Order of Friars Minor
Francisco Zamora, musician in Puerto Rican group, Los Favoritos